Ash is an unincorporated community in Houston County, Texas, United States. The community was established in 1870 and named for community leader James B. Ash. Ash had a post office from 1890 to 1909. By 2000, its population was 19.

References

Unincorporated communities in Houston County, Texas
Unincorporated communities in Texas
Populated places established in 1870
1870 establishments in Texas